Omand is a surname. Notable people with the surname include:

 David Omand (born 1947), British senior civil servant
 Willie Omand or Junior Omand, (1931–2005), Scottish footballer
 John Omand (1823–1905), the namesake of Omand's Creek